Huffmanela filamentosa is a parasitic nematode It has been observed on the gills of the lethrinid fish Gymnocranius oblongus and Gymnocranius grandoculis off New Caledonia. Its eggs are released from the gill mucosa with the turnover of living tissues and immediately continue their life-cycle.

Description

The adults are unknown, only the eggs were described. The eggs are 48–53 micrometers in length and 25–30 micrometers in width, with thin shells. Each egg bears a few long (150 micrometers), thin filaments.

See also 
 Huffmanela branchialis
 Huffmanela ossicola

References

External links 

 Zoobank record for Huffmanela filamentosa

Enoplea
Parasitic nematodes of fish
Nematodes described in 2004